Thalita Carauta (born 2 October 1982)  is a Brazilian actress. She became known in Brazil in 2010 for playing Janete in Zorra Total. Among other works are "Todas as Flores" and "Segundo Sol".

Filmography

Awards and nominations

References

External links
 

Living people
1982 births
21st-century Brazilian actresses
21st-century Brazilian businesswomen
21st-century Brazilian businesspeople
People from São Paulo